Leicestershire County Council elections are held every four years. Leicestershire County Council is the upper-tier authority for the non-metropolitan county of Leicestershire in England. Since the last boundary changes in 2017, 55 county councillors have been elected from 53 electoral divisions.

Political control
Leicestershire County Council was first created in 1889. Its territory and its powers and responsibilities were significantly reformed under the Local Government Act 1972, with a new council elected in 1973 to act as a shadow authority ahead of the new powers coming into force in 1974. Since 1973, political control of the council has been held by the following parties:

Leadership
The leaders of the council since 1999 have been:

Council elections
 2001 Leicestershire County Council election
 2005 Leicestershire County Council election (boundary changes took place for this election)
 2009 Leicestershire County Council election
 2013 Leicestershire County Council election
 2017 Leicestershire County Council election
2021 Leicestershire County Council election

County result maps

Changes between elections

1993-1997

1997-2001

2005-2009

2009-2013

2013-2017

2017-2021

References

Sources
By-election results

External links
Leicestershire County Council

 
Council elections in the East Midlands
Council elections in Leicestershire
County council elections in England